Mile Smodlaka (born 1 January 1976) is a Croatian former professional water polo player and coach who competed in the 2000, 2004 and the 2008 Summer Olympics. He is currently the head coach of Jadran Split and an assistant coach of the Croatian men's national team.

See also
 List of world champions in men's water polo
 List of World Aquatics Championships medalists in water polo

References

External links
 

1976 births
Living people
Croatian male water polo players
Olympic water polo players of Croatia
Water polo players at the 2000 Summer Olympics
Water polo players at the 2004 Summer Olympics
Water polo players at the 2008 Summer Olympics
Water polo players from Split, Croatia
World Aquatics Championships medalists in water polo
Croatian water polo coaches